King James Academy may refer to:

King James Academy Royston, a secondary school in Royston, Hertfordshire, England
King James I Academy, a secondary school in Bishop Auckland, County Durham, England

See also
King James (disambiguation)